Abdul Shakoor al-Turkistani, also known as Abdul Shakoor Damla and Emeti Yakuf , was the emir of the East Turkistan Islamic Party, an Islamist organisation that seeks independence for China's Xinjiang province and for it to become an Islamic state. In August 2011, Abdul Shakoor reportedly appeared in a video with his face obscured taking responsibility for the 2011 Kashgar attacks and 2011 Hotan attack.

Abdul Shakoor reportedly took command of al Qaeda forces in the Federally Administered Tribal Areas in April 2011 after Saif al-Adel left the region, according to the jihadist newspaper Karachi Islam.

Abdul Shakoor was killed in North Waziristan in a CIA drone strike on August 24, 2012.

References

Pakistani al-Qaeda members
Uyghur activists
East Turkestan independence activists
Chinese Islamists
2012 deaths
Deaths by drone strikes of the Central Intelligence Agency in Pakistan
Turkistan Islamic Party
1965 births